The Exodus Decoded is a 2006 documentary film by "investigative archaeologist" and filmmaker Simcha Jacobovici and producer/director James Cameron. It aired on April 16 on The History Channel. The documentary proposes naturalistic origins for the plagues of Egypt as described in the Book of Exodus.

Premise 
The documentary deals with The Exodus, the founding myth of the Israelites. While few mainstream historians would consider the Book of Exodus as a reliable narrative, Cameron and Jacobovici present a speculative question as to whether the events as described, particularly relating to the plagues of Egypt, could be explained naturalistically. Central to its thesis is the volcanic eruption of Thera/Santorini.

A suggested date of 1500 BC is made for the Exodus, during the reign of pharaoh Ahmose I.  The "palpable darkness" described as the 9th plague, is hypothetically attributed to the cloud of volcanic ash caused by the Minoan eruption, which is identified as the events described in the Tempest Stele. A conjectural limnic eruption in the Nile Delta, similar to that of the Lake Nyos disaster in 1986, is explored as a further source of mass death.

The documentary first aired on Discovery Channel Canada on April 16, 2006.

Reception

As a popular history documentary, The Exodus Decoded attracted few critiques from mainstream scholars. The Washington Post described the use of CGI as "stunning", a view shared by The New York Times, which placed the documentary's content firmly in the realms of conspiracy theory. A review in The Jerusalem Post noted that none of the arguments made in the film were accepted by mainstream archaeology and that film-maker Jacobovici freely admitted his lack of academic credentials.

See also
 Passage of the Red Sea
 Tempest Stele (alt. Storm Stele, erected by pharaoh Ahmose I, and called Akmose/Ahmose stele in the film)
 Thera (Santorini) eruption Association with the Exodus
 Plagues of Egypt

References

External links

2006 films
2006 television films
2006 computer-animated films
2006 documentary films
Canadian documentary television films
Documentary films about the Bible
Films with live action and animation
History (American TV channel) original programming
Films about the ten plagues of Egypt
Historical theories and materials on the Exodus
Pseudoscience documentary films
Films based on the Book of Exodus
Films directed by Simcha Jacobovici
2000s Canadian films